Saccocera orpheus is a moth in the family Brachodidae. It was described by Kallies in 2004. It is found on the Indonesian islands of Java and Sulawesi.

The wingspan is 16.5 mm for males and 24 mm for females. The forewings are black in the basal area with whitish tipped scales and in the distal part mixed with single whitish scales. The hindwings are black, with a white subbasal patch.

Etymology
The species is named for Orpheus and refers to the dark coloration of the species.

References

Natural History Museum Lepidoptera generic names catalog

Brachodidae
Moths described in 2004